{{chembox
| Verifiedfields = changed
| verifiedrevid = 470603009
| Name = Terthiophene
| ImageFile = Alpha-Terthiophene numbering.svg
| ImageName = Terthiophene
| PIN = 12,22:25,32-Terthiophene
| OtherNames = α-Terthienyl2,5-Di(2-thienyl)thiophene
|Section1=
|Section2=
|Section3=
|Section7={{Chembox Hazards
| ExternalSDS =
| MainHazards = flammable
| GHS_ref=<ref>{{cite web |title=2,2':5',2-Terthiophene |url=https://pubchem.ncbi.nlm.nih.gov/compound/65067#section=Safety-and-Hazards |website=pubchem.ncbi.nlm.nih.gov |language=en}}</ref>
| GHSPictograms = 
| GHSSignalWord = Warning
| HPhrases = 
| PPhrases = 
  }}
|Section8=
}}

Terthiophene is the organic compound with the formula [C4H3S]2C4H2S. It is an oligomer of the heterocycle thiophene, a shorter oligomer is dithienyl, and the parent polymer is polythiophene. In the most common isomer of terthiophene, two thienyl groups are connected via their 2 positions to a central thiophene, also at the carbon atoms flanking the sulfur.

Preparation of terthiophene
Terthiophene is prepared by the nickel- or palladium-catalysed coupling reaction of 2,5-dibromothiophene with the Grignard reagent derived from 2-bromothiophene.

Properties and applications
This isomer is a pigment in African marigolds (Tagetes spp.) and exhibits some biological activity because it sensitizes the formation of singlet oxygen. It is responsible for the insecticidal activity of Tagetes minuta''.

Together with derivatives of 2,2'-bithiophene, various substituted terthiophenes occur naturally. Examples include 5,5''-dichloro-α-terthiophene, 5-chloro-α-terthiophene, 5-acetyl α-terthiophene, and 5-carboxyl bithiophene.

Terthiophene has been employed as building block for the organic semi-conductor polythiophene.

See also
 Biphenyl
 Terphenyl
 Terpyridine

References

Thiophenes